Yamashina's ground gecko (Goniurosaurus yamashinae)  is a species of gecko. It is endemic to Kume Island in the Ryukyu Islands of Japan.

References

Goniurosaurus
Endemic reptiles of Japan
Endemic fauna of the Ryukyu Islands
Reptiles described in 1936